(Not For) All the Tea in China may refer to:

Books
All the Tea in China, novel by Kyril Bonfiglioli 
For All the Tea in China, novel by Sarah Rose 2009

Film and TV
"All the Tea in China", TV episode Lucky Feller 1976
"For All the Tea in China", TV episode of Touched by an Angel 2002

Music

Songs
"All The Tea in China", song by Susan Jacks 1980
"All the Tea in China", song by Hugh Cornwell from Wolf 1988
"For All the Tea in China", song by Sharon O'Neill